Elappally is a village in Thodupuzha Taluk, Idukki district in Kerala, India. It is located 26 km from Thodupuzha, 85 km from Kochi, and 70 km from Kottayam.

The Elappally Falls are situated near Moolamattom Wagamon road, which originates in the upper reaches of the Western Ghats. It is most active during the monsoon season.

Route:
Accessibility through Road only.
Kottayam - Pala - Kollappally - Neeloor - Muttom - Moolamattom - Elappally 70 km.
Ernakulam - Muvattupuzha - Thodupuzha - Moolamattom - Elappally 85 km.

Nearest airports
Kochi International Airport

Nearest railway stations
 Thripponithura -TRTR
 Ernakulam Junction (Ernakulam South)
 ERS, Ernakulam Town (Ernakulam North)
 ERN, Aluva
 AWY and Kottayam
 KTYM

Demographics
 India census, Elappally had a population of 4849 with 2423 males and 2426 females.

Religious institutions
 St.Luke's C S I Church, Elappally
 St.Mary's Church, Elappally
 Sree Dharma Sastha Temple, Elappally
 IPC Hebron Church, Elappally

References

Villages in Idukki district